Matadi Tshimpi Airport  is an airport serving the city of Matadi in Kongo Central Province, Democratic Republic of the Congo. The runway is north of Matadi, across the Congo River.

Airlines and destinations

See also

Transport in the Democratic Republic of the Congo
List of airports in the Democratic Republic of the Congo

References

External links
 FallingRain - Matadi
 HERE Maps - Matadi
 OpenStreetMap - Matadi
 OurAirports - Matadi
 

Airports in Kongo Central Province